The 2015 Premier League Asia Trophy was the seventh edition of the Premier League Asia Trophy. Arsenal, Everton, Stoke City and Singapore Selection XI competed for the Premier League Asia Trophy. It was held in Singapore at the National Stadium from 15–18 July 2015. The 3rd/4th placing and finals were played on 18 July 2015.

Results
{{Round4-with third

|15 July – Singapore| Everton (pen.)| 0 (5) | Stoke City |  0 (4)
|15 July – Singapore| Singapore Select XI| 0 | Arsenal|4 

|18 July – Singapore| Everton|1| Arsenal|3 

|18 July – Singapore| Stoke City|2| Singapore Select XI'|0
}}

Semi-finalsAll kick-off times are local'' (UTC+08:00).

Third place play-off

Final

Goalscorers

3 goals

 Chuba Akpom

1 goal

 Marko Arnautović
 Ross Barkley
 Steve Sidwell
 Theo Walcott
 Jack Wilshere
 Mesut Özil
 Santi Cazorla

References

External links

Premier League Asia Trophy
Prem
Asia
2015